Howie Davis was a native of Far Rockaway, New York who founded the Harlem Wizards basketball team.  He worked for many years as a sports promoter.  He was a promoter for the  Brooklyn Dodgers and the Staten Island Stapes football teams. He raised over 150 million dollars for schools.

References

American sports businesspeople
Brooklyn Dodgers (NFL)
Staten Island Stapletons
People from Far Rockaway, Queens
Year of birth missing